The Cow (Gāv or Gav) is a 1969 Iranian film directed by Dariush Mehrjui, written by Gholam-Hossein Saedi based on his own play and novel, and starring Ezzatolah Entezami as Masht Hassan. Some critics consider it the first film of the Iranian New Wave.

Plot
The story begins by showcasing the close relationship between a middle-aged Iranian villager Masht Hassan and his beloved cow. Hassan is married but has no children. His only valuable property is a cow that he cherishes as the only cow in the village.
When Hassan must leave the village for a short time, the pregnant cow is found dead in the barn. Hassan's fellow villagers fear his reaction and cover up the evidence of the death and tell him upon his return that his cow has run away. Finding great difficulty confronting the loss of his beloved cow, as well the loss of livestock that affects his social stature at the village, Hassan gradually goes insane following a nervous breakdown and believes he is the cow, adopting such mannerisms as eating hay. His wife and the villagers try in vain to restore his sanity.

Analysis
The movie is very well-known because of its psychological and social criticisms. There are several psychological messages behind the main character’s delusion of being a cow. It opens up Marx's theory of alienation and social alienation and describes how the main character loses himself in the struggle of finding his cow which is his most valuable property. It reveals how much Masht Hassan and his family’s life is depended on the cow both economically and emotionally that Masht Hassan cannot handle the situation logically.

The movie depicts a very superstitious society in which people believe in an ultimate ultra-mundane power which will save them from the devil, the eternal enemy of mankind. The shadows of this illusion (enemy illusion) are to the extent that the people having a sense of paranoia and are always ready to confront the conspiracy of their enemies. In such a society, women have no significant role apart from being good wives and mothers who are expected to follow the social norm and be a typical Iranian woman.

Cast
 Ezzatollah Entezami as Masht Hasan
 Mahin Shahabi	as Masht Hasan's wife
 Ali Nassirian as Masht Eslam
 Jamshid Mashayekhi as Abbas
 Firouz Behjat-Mohamadi	
 Jafar Vali as Kadkhoda (Village headman)
 Khosrow Shojazadeh as young man
 Ezzatollah Ramazanifar as madman
 Esmat Safavi as old woman
 Mahmoud Dowlatabadi as Esma'il	
 Parviz Fannizadeh	
 Mahtaj Nojoomi as Esma'il's sister

Development
The Buyid prince Majd ad-Dawla was reported to have thought of himself as a cow. He was subsequently cured of his delusion by the medieval Persian physician Avicenna. It is possible that elements of the plot of The Cow were inspired by this.

Reception
Iran's Ayatollah Khomeini was reported to have admired this film. This in turn was reported to have been the saving grace that allowed Iranian cinema to continue rather than being banned after the Iranian Revolution.

Awards
 Best Film Award La Rochelle 1994
 OCIC Award - Recommendation - Forum of New Film 22nd Berlin International Film Festival 1972
 FIPRESCI Prize 32nd Venice International Film Festival 1971
 Best Actor Award Chicago International Film Festival 1971
 Award for Best Screenplay Sepas Film Festival 1970

Notes

External links
 
 Fribourg International Film Festival
 Fandor
 , FirouzanFilms
 The Cow in Films Anywhere You Want

1969 films
1969 drama films
Iranian films based on plays
Films based on works by Gholam-Hossein Sa'edi
1960s Persian-language films
Films directed by Dariush Mehrjui
Iranian black-and-white films
Films based on multiple works
Films set in Iran
Films about mental health
Film controversies in Iran